Welcome to the Discworld is a short (8-minute) animated television adaptation of a fragment of the novel, Reaper Man, by Terry Pratchett, produced by Cosgrove Hall in 1996. It is the first film adaptation of a Discworld novel and is followed by the TV series Soul Music and Wyrd Sisters. The rest of Reaper Man is not filmed.

The film features Christopher Lee as the voice of Death, as did the following animated TV series and the 2008 Terry Pratchett's The Colour of Magic live-action TV miniseries.

External links
 

Discworld films and television series
Cosgrove Hall Films films